Nikki Manson (born 15 October 1994 in Glasgow) is a Scottish athlete who competes in the high jump event. She has a personal best performance of 1.93 metres.

Athletics career
Manson achieved 7th place at the 2018 Commonwealth Games in Queensland, Australia and has represented Great Britain at the 2018 European championships in Berlin.

She is also the Scottish Indoor record holder with a height of 1.93 metres achieved in February 2020.

References

1994 births
Living people
Scottish female high jumpers
British female high jumpers
Athletes (track and field) at the 2018 Commonwealth Games
Commonwealth Games competitors for Scotland
Akron Zips women's track and field athletes